Senf is a surname. Notable people with the surname include:

 Carol Senf, American academic
 Rebecca Senf (born 1972), American writer and curator
 Margit Senf (born 1945), East German pair skater

See also
 Sen (surname)
 Senn